The 1922–23 İstanbul Football League season was the 16th season of the league. Fenerbahçe won the league for the fourth time.

Season

References
 Dağlaroğlu, Rüştü. Fenerbahçe Spor Kulübü Tarihi 1907-1957

Istanbul Football League seasons
Istanbul
Istanbul